Sepedoninus is a genus of flies in the family Sciomyzidae, the marsh flies or snail-killing flies.

Species
Species include:
S. curvisetis Verbeke, 1950
S. planifrons Verbeke, 1950

References

Sciomyzidae
Sciomyzoidea genera